The 2022–23 Boston University Terriers men's basketball team represented Boston University in the 2022–23 NCAA Division I men's basketball season. The Terriers, led by 12th-year head coach Joe Jones, played their home games at Case Gym in Boston, Massachusetts as members of the Patriot League.

Previous season
The Terriers finished the 2021–22 season 22–13, 11–7 in Patriot League play to finish in third place. In the Patriot League tournament, they defeated Loyola (MD) in the quarterfinals, before falling to Navy in the semifinals. They were invited to the CBI, where they defeated UNC Greensboro in the first round, before falling to Middle Tennessee in the quarterfinals.

Roster

Schedule and results

|-
!colspan=12 style=""| Non-conference regular season

|-
!colspan=12 style=""| Patriot League regular season

|-
!colspan=9 style=| Patriot League tournament

|-

Sources

References

Boston University Terriers men's basketball seasons
Boston University Terriers
Boston University Terriers men's basketball
Boston University Terriers men's basketball
Boston University Terriers men's basketball
Boston University Terriers men's basketball